Haven is an extinct town in Grant County, in the U.S. state of Washington.

A post office called Haven was established in 1907, and remained in operation until 1913. The community has the name of Henry H. Haven.

References

Ghost towns in Washington (state)
Geography of Grant County, Washington